Whitlingham is a small churchless parish and hamlet at the mouth of the River Wensum in Norfolk, England. It is located 3 miles (5 km) east of Norwich, on the south bank of the River Yare, reached from Trowse along Whitlingham Lane.

Church
The round-towered church of St. Andrew was dilapidated about 1630, and for centuries was a picturesque ruin on the verge of a lofty precipice, overlooking the river. There is photographic evidence to suggest the ruins were prettified during the second half of the 19th century, with eroded parapets rebuilt, and new window tracery inserted.  The round tower collapsed in 1940 and today the fragmentary ruins are very overgrown.

Broads and country park

The Great Broad at Whitlingham Park has been created through the process of gravel extraction. The extraction work at Whitlingham began in 1990 with the creation of the Little Broad. In 1995, work began on the Great Broad, with the quarry removing around 220,000 tonnes of material a year.

The quarry is owned and was run by Lafarge Aggregates. The Whitlingham Quarry is now closed and has been turned into a car park and campsite for the country park users.

Gravel from Whitlingham has been used to build projects in the city such as the Castle Mall, The Forum and more recently, the redevelopment of the old Nestlé site into a major new shopping facility Chapelfield.

An activity centre has now been built on the south bank of the Great Broad; construction was funded by the National Lottery and Sport England and the centre is run by Norfolk County Council. Norfolk County Council leases the Great Broad from the Crown Point Estate which is represented by the Whitlingham Charitable Trust.

The Little Broad had a beach. Since late 2008, following a fatal accident, swimming has been discouraged. There was a further double drowning in 2015 on the third broad across the river on the Thorpe side. The Broads Authority is planning to bring in bylaws to make swimming illegal, except in organised groups run through the Whitlingham Adventure centre. Such events include the annual Norwich Triathlon in July.

Both Wherryman's Way long distance footpath and National Cycle Route 1 pass through the park.

The park was visited by Prime Minister Gordon Brown in July 2008, at the start of his East Anglian holiday.

Woods

Situated at the lower end of the country park, this area has a history of mining, including flint-knapping from 4000BC, up to the 18th century. Archaeologists have found a number of artefacts in this area, including humanly struck flint flakes and part of a chipped flint axe-head from the Neolithic period, along with an iron-stained flint blade dating back to the Paleolithic period (500,000 BC to 10,001 BC). From the 18th century until the early 20th century the area produced chalk and lime, the deep chalk pits are still present though overgrown and a Lime kiln is reached by a signed footpath from Whitlingham Lane. Since then this area has been developing from open landscape to the woodland of today.

Railway station
Whitlingham railway station is situated to the north of the River Yare close to Thorpe St Andrew. It used to be served by trains out of Norwich, but is now closed.

References

External links

 Whitlingham Nature Walk
 Whitlingham History Walk
 Video Tour
 360° view of Whitlingham Great Broad
 Whitlingham Adventure activity centre

South Norfolk
Villages in Norfolk